A list of books and essays about Howard Hughes:

Hughes, Howard
Howard Hughes